Jean-Christophe Grangé (born 15 July 1961) is a French mystery writer, journalist, and screenwriter.

Grangé was born in Paris. He was a journalist before setting up his own press agency L & G.

Bibliography
 Le Vol des cigognes (1994)
 English translation: Flight of the Storks
 Les rivières pourpres (1998)
 English translation: Blood Red Rivers (1999)
 Film adaption: The Crimson Rivers (2000)
 TV series: The Crimson Rivers (2018-)
 Le Concile de Pierre (2001)
 English translation: The Stone Council
 Film adaptation: The Stone Council (2006)
  (2003)
 English translation: The Empire of the Wolves
 Film adaptation: L'Empire des loups (2005)
 La Ligne noire (2004)
 Le Serment des limbes (2007)
 Misèrere (2008)
 La Forêt des Mânes (2009)
 Le Passager (2011)
 Kaiken (2012)
 Lontano (2015)
 Congo Requiem (2016)
 La Terre des morts (2018)
 La Dernière Chasse (2019)
 Le Jour des Cendres (2020)
 Les Promises (2021)

External links

JC-Grange Official website

1961 births
Living people
Writers from Paris
20th-century French novelists
21st-century French novelists
Thriller writers
Paris Match writers
French male novelists
20th-century French male writers
21st-century French male writers